The Miss Universo Uruguay 2009 was held on February 28, 2009. The winner represented Uruguay at Miss Universe 2009 and Miss World 2009. The Best Departemental Costume was used in Miss Universe.

Results
Miss Universo Uruguay 2009: Cintia D'Ottone (Colonia)
1st Runner Up: Karen Gutiérrez (Tacuarembó)
2nd Runner Up: Nadia Teodulos (Treinta y Tres)
3rd Runner Up: Rocío Torres (Paysandu)

Top 8

Patricia Callero (Canelones)
Rosario Cabrera (Paysandú)
Sofia Scarenzio (Distrito Capital)
Valentina Fernández (San José)

Special awards
 Miss Photogenic (voted by press reporters) - Rosario Cabrera (Paysandú)
 Miss Congeniality (voted by Miss Universo Uruguay contestants) - Valentina Fernández (San José)
 Miss Internet - Nadia Teodulos (Treinta y Tres)
 Best Look - Nadia Teodulos (Treinta y Tres)
 Best Face - Nadia Teodulos (Treinta y Tres)
 Best Departemental Costume - Patricia Callero (Canelones)

Delegates

Artigas - Johana Rivas
Canelones - Patricia Callero
Colonia - Cintia D'Ottone
Distrito Capital - Sofia Scarenzio
Durazno - Isabela Sparapaglione
Maldonado - Ana Laura Santana
Montevideo - Sabrina Martinez
Paysandú - Rosario Cabrera

Río Negro - Sofia Alberti
Rivera - Andrea de Armas
Salto - Silvana Giordano
San José - Valentina Fernández
Soriano - Rocío Torres
Tacuarembó - Karen Gutiérrez
Treinta y Tres - Nadia Teodulos

External links
http://foro.univision.com/univision/board/message?board.id=miss&message.id=2948806
http://www.puntaweb.com/cgi-bin/eventos/ver_evento_div.pl?numero_evento=5439
https://web.archive.org/web/20090304190643/http://www.globalbeauties.com/news/2009/mar/uru.htm

Miss Universo Uruguay
2009 in Uruguay
2009 beauty pageants